Maciej Domański (born 5 September 1990) is a Polish professional footballer who plays as a midfielder for Stal Mielec.

References

Polish footballers
1990 births
Living people
Association football midfielders
Stal Mielec players
Radomiak Radom players
Siarka Tarnobrzeg players
Puszcza Niepołomice players
Raków Częstochowa players
Ekstraklasa players
I liga players
II liga players
III liga players
People from Rzeszów